Stanisław Wycech (27 June 1902 – 12 January 2008) was, at age 105, the last Polish veteran of the First World War. At the time of his death, he was, at age 105, the youngest living veteran of the war. Wycech was underage when he enlisted in the Polish Military Organisation in 1917 aged only 15 and participated in the disarming of German troops on 10 November 1918. He did not participate in the Greater Poland Uprising due to contracting typhoid, but was also a veteran of the Polish-Soviet War. He fought during World War II and he took part in the Warsaw Uprising. He resided in Warsaw until his death at age 105.

See also

 List of last surviving World War I veterans by country

References
 Obituary
 "Last Polish WWI veteran, 105, remembers his teenage soldiering", Agence France Presse
 Serwis Informacyjny Urzędu Miasta i Gminy w Radzyminie 
 Kombatant 
 Wieści Podwarszawskie 
 Gazeta.ie 
 2007 Serwis Informacyjny Urzędu Miasta i Gminy w Radzyminie 

1902 births
2008 deaths
People from Węgrów County
Polish Military Organisation members
Polish centenarians
Men centenarians
Child soldiers in World War I